Discard is an EP by  Figurine released in 2002 on 555 Records.

Track listing
 "Miss Miss"
 "Don't Stop Dancing"
 "Connections"
 "Not Love Yet"

2002 debut EPs
Figurine (band) albums